Ichioka (written: 一岡) is a Japanese surname. Notable people with the surname include:

, Japanese baseball player
Yuji Ichioka (1936–2002), American historian and activist

See also
, a train station in Niimi, Okayama Prefecture, Japan

Japanese-language surnames